Aere or AERE may refer to:
 Association of Environmental and Resource Economists, in the United States
 Atomic Energy Research Establishment, in the United Kingdom
 Atomic Energy Research Establishment (Bangladesh)
 Tropical Storm Aere, various tropical storms